Tom Chase (born March 6, 1965) is an American gay pornographic film actor who was active in the 1990s and 2000s. He is best known as the first lifetime exclusive model for Falcon Studios, and for his later work at Colt Studio Group.

Biography
Chase was raised in Highland Park, Texas. At the age of 30, he was inspired by the 1993 pornographic film On the Mark to enter the adult film industry, and submitted photographs of himself to the film's producers at Falcon Studios. He was cast in his first adult film, 1996's Backwoods, a week after being interviewed by Falcon, and relocated from Boston to San Francisco.

At Falcon, Chase would become emblematic of what Claude J. Summers' The Queer Encyclopedia of Film and Television describes as "the new wave of gay porn stars in the new millennium: masculine and muscular, sexually versatile, and confidently gay," and would become the studio's first lifetime exclusive model. He would become known for his dominant performances and his exceptionally large endowment, though Chase has described himself as "the Wally Cleaver of porn" in reference to erotica initially not coming naturally to him. He frequently performed as a top, though his bottoming debut in 1997's California Kings would win him a GayVN Award and a Gay Erotic Video Award.

Chase would work frequently with directors John Rutherford and Chi Chi Larue at Falcon, and would appear in the Larue-directed music video for "I Am a Pig" by 2wo, a side project of Judas Priest lead singer Rob Halford. Chase was romantically involved with the adult film actor Joe Cade; they had a commitment ceremony in 1998, but later separated amicably. In 2004, Chase was inducted into the GayVN Hall of Fame, and announced his retirement from the adult entertainment industry in his acceptance speech. He moved to Granbury, Texas and later Dallas before returning to the adult entertainment industry in 2006 as a model for Colt Studios, where he appeared in films with a more hirsute and bear-like appearance.

His most recent (and, to date, final) credited adult film is The Big One, a bareback film released in 2009 for the now-defunct gay pornography studio Butch Bear. Chase was interviewed for the 2015 documentary Seed Money: The Chuck Holmes Story, which follows the life of Falcon Studios founder Chuck Holmes.

Awards

|-
! scope="row" | 1997
| 
| Best Actor
| Men in Video Awards
| 
| 
| 
|-
! scope="row" | 1997
| 
| Best Top
| Gay Erotic Video Awards
| 
|
| 
|-
! scope="row" | 1998
| California Kings
| Best Erotic Scene 
| Gay Erotic Video Awards
| 
| With Mike Branson.
| 
|-
! scope="row" | 1998
| California Kings
| Best Sex Scene
| GayVN Awards
| 
| With Mike Branson.
| 
|-
! scope="row" | 2000
| 
| Best Top
| Men in Video Awards 
| 
| 
| 
|-
! scope="row" | 2000
| 
| Hottest Cock
| Men in Video Awards 
| 
| 
| 
|-
! scope="row" | 2004 
| 
| GayVN Hall of Fame
| GayVN Awards
| 
| 
| 
|-
! scope="row" | 2008
| Waterbucks 2
| Best Duo
| Kiwi Awards
| 
| With Skye Woods.
| 
|-

References

External links
 
 
 

1965 births
Living people
20th-century American male actors
American actors in gay pornographic films
Gay pornographic film actors
People from Highland Park, Texas